"Big Ole Butt" is the third single from LL Cool J's third album, Walking with a Panther. It was released in 1989 for Def Jam Recordings and was produced by Dwayne Simon and LL Cool J.  "Big Ole Butt" would prove to be a mild success, making it to #13 on the Hot Rap Singles and #57 on the Hot R&B/Hip-Hop Singles & Tracks.  The B-side, "One Shot at Love", was released again as the fourth single from the album. It contains a sample of "Ride Sally Ride" by Dennis Coffey from the 1972 album Goin' for Myself.

Track listing

A-side
"Big Ole Butt" (J.T. Smith, D. Simon, B. Latture) - 4:35

B-side
"One Shot at Love" (J.T. Smith, D. Simon, S. Ett)- 4:19

1989 singles
LL Cool J songs
Songs written by LL Cool J
1989 songs
Def Jam Recordings singles
Dirty rap songs
Songs written by Dwayne Simon